Karl Mueller may refer to:

Karl Mueller - famous artist and father of Merrill Mueller
Karl Mueller (rock musician)